The Man in a Blue Turban with a Face is the debut album by experimental rock group Man Man.

Track listing
"Against the Peruvian Monster"
"10lb Moustache"
"Zebra"
"Sarsparillsa"
"White Rice, Brown Heart"
"Gold Teeth"
"Magic Blood"
"The Fog or China"
"I, Manface"
"Man Who Make You Sick"
"Werewolf (On the Hood of Yer Heartbreak)"

References

External links
"10 lb. Mustache" video

2004 debut albums
Man Man albums
Ace Fu Records albums